Daphne aurantiaca (syn. Daphne calcicola) is a shrub of the family Thymelaeaceae.  It is native to China, specifically Sichuan and Yunnan.

Description
The shrub is evergreen, and grows from 0.6 to 1.2 meters tall.  Its different variants grow either erect or more prostrate, accounting for the variance in height. It is often found on slopes and ledges, particularly the faces of limestone cliffs.  It was introduced to European gardens by  George Forrest in 1906, from collections in the Lijiang Range in NW Yunnan. He described it as "One of the most beautiful plants in western Yunnan".

Varieties
There are two varieties: 
 Daphne aurantiaca var. aurantiaca is taller and grows erect
 Daphne aurantiaca var. calcicola grows more prostrate and irregularly: it has been treated as a separate species, Daphne calcicola: its compact growth makes it more attractive to gardeners

References

aurantiaca